The Embassy of Benin in Moscow is the diplomatic mission of Benin in the Russian Federation. It is located at 7 Uspensky Lane in the Tverskoy District of Moscow.

See also 
 Benin–Russia relations
 Diplomatic missions in Russia

References 

Benin–Russia relations
Benin
Moscow